George Krouskop (May 12, 1832 – May 23, 1897), was a member of the Wisconsin State Senate.

Biography
Krouskop was born in Bellefontaine, Ohio. He moved to Sextonville, Wisconsin. Krouskop is buried in Richland Center, Wisconsin.

Career
Krouskop was a member of the Senate twice. First, from 1870 to 1871 and second, from 1874 to 1875. He was a Democrat.

References

People from Bellefontaine, Ohio
People from Richland County, Wisconsin
Democratic Party Wisconsin state senators
1832 births
1897 deaths
19th-century American politicians